Price V. Fishback (born c. 1955) is an economic historian.  He is a professor of economics at the University of Arizona and a research associate at the National Bureau of Economic Research. His research on American economic history has included employment and labor in the nineteenth and early twentieth centuries especially in the coal industry, and government programs of the New Deal. His work has been recognised by the Cliometric Society via their awarding him a Clio Can in recognition of his "exceptional support of cliometrics". Prior to arriving to the University of Arizona, Fishback was an Assistant and later Associate Professor at the University of Georgia.

Education
Fishback received a B.A. with honors in Mathematics and Economics from Butler University in 1977. He then received his M.A. and Ph.D. from the University of Washington in 1979 and 1983, respectively. His Ph.D. Thesis was entitled "Employment Conditions of Blacks in the Coal Industry, 1900-1930." His advisor was Robert Higgs.

Selected publications

 Well Worth Saving: How the New Deal Safeguarded Home Ownership, with Jonathan Rose and Kenneth Snowden. 2013.  Chicago, IL:  University of Chicago Press.
  "The Newest on the New Deal"  Essays in Economic & Business History 36(1) (2018)  covers  distribution and impact of spending and lending programs; online

References

External links 
 Price V. Fishback, Department of Economics, University of Arizona
 Price V. Fishback at The Independent Institute

1950s births
Living people
Economic historians
Presidents of the Economic History Association